Ethel Rebecca Benjamin (19 January 1875 – 14 October 1943) was New Zealand's first female lawyer. On 17 September 1897, she became the first woman in the British Empire to appear as counsel in court, representing a client for the recovery of a debt. She was the second woman in the Empire to be admitted as a barrister and solicitor, two months after Clara Brett Martin of Canada.

Early life
Benjamin was born in Dunedin, to Lizzie Mark and Henry Benjamin. Lizzie and Henry had emigrated from England in the late 1860s. Harry became a Dunedin sharebroker. The family were Orthodox Jews. Benjamin was the eldest in a family of five girls and two boys. She attended Otago Girls' High School from 1883 to 1892. While there, she won the "Victoria" prize for order, diligence and punctuality, and also an Education Board Junior Scholarship.

Legal career
In 1892 Benjamin won a university scholarship, and in 1893 she enrolled at the University of Otago for an LLB degree, not knowing if she would be able to practice law on completion:

Benjamin graduated in July 1897, having achieved outstanding marks in her course. The Female Law Practitioners Act was passed in 1896 and on 10 May 1897 she was admitted as a barrister and solicitor of the Supreme Court of New Zealand.

Upon her graduation, Benjamin was asked to speak on behalf of all the graduates. She is reported to have said:

Despite receiving adverse treatment from the Otago District Law Society at the time, such as restricted access to the society's library, she opened and ran a successful legal practice in Princes Street, primarily as a solicitor. Her cases included wife abuse, divorce, and adoption. Developing her private practice wasn't easy. The Law Society made things difficult for her by not inviting her to official functions such as their annual dinner, and tried to enforce a dress code on her. Her main sources of clients were the Jewish community and women with financial interests. She also represented several hotels and publicans' associations on matters related to prohibition - she was one of the few nineteenth-century New Zealand feminists who didn't support temperance.

Ethel Benjamin was a founding member of the Dunedin branch of the New Zealand Society for the Protection of Women and Children (founded in 1899) and was its honorary solicitor.

Marriage and relocations
In 1906 Ethel Benjamin moved to Christchurch and managed a restaurant at the International Exhibition. She married Alfred Mark Ralph De Costa, a Wellington sharebroker, in 1907, and moved to live with him in Wellington. She continued her legal practice, in an office adjacent to her husband's, and began to specialise in property speculation. In 1908, the De Costas moved to England and during World War I Ethel De Costa managed a bank in Sheffield. She also worked in a law firm, but couldn't practise law fully until the Sex Disqualification (Removal) Act was passed in 1919. Between the wars, the De Costas lived in southern France and Italy. Alfred died just before the Second World War started, but Ethel continued to work as a lawyer in London. Ethel was accidentally struck by a motor vehicle, and died of a fractured skull at Mount Vernon Hospital in Northwood, Middlesex, England, on 14 October 1943.

Legacy
The Ethel Benjamin Prize for women was established in 1997 by the New Zealand Law Foundation, to mark the centenary of the admission of Ethel Benjamin as New Zealand's first woman barrister and solicitor.  the $20,000 NZD prize is awarded annually, to two female recipients. Past recipients include Claudia Geiringer (2001) and Jessica Palmer (2004).

Ethel Benjamin Place, a cul-de-sac across the road from the University of Otago Central Library, was named after the lawyer, during Suffrage Centennial Year 1993.

In 2019, three Belgian entrepreneurs continued to honour her legacy by calling their legal tech and design agency "Ethel".

See also
Cornelia Sorabji in India
Eliza Orme in England
First women lawyers around the world
Ivy Williams in England

References

Further reading

External links

University of Otago Law Faculty welcome
New Zealand Law Foundation Scholarship details
Te Ara Encyclopedia of New Zealand - Jews
Ethel Benjamin address - early women lawyers
Ethel Benjamin Scholarship

1875 births
1943 deaths
New Zealand Jews
Lawyers from Dunedin
University of Otago alumni
People educated at Otago Girls' High School
New Zealand women lawyers
19th-century New Zealand lawyers
20th-century New Zealand lawyers
20th-century women lawyers
19th-century women lawyers